Påskallavik is a locality situated in Oskarshamn Municipality, Kalmar County, Sweden with 1,083 inhabitants in 2010.

References

External links 

Populated places in Kalmar County
Populated places in Oskarshamn Municipality
Market towns in Sweden

ru:Ин-Фа-Лин, Сергей Владимирович